The Price of a Song is a 1935 British crime film, directed by Michael Powell.  It is one of 23 quota quickies Powell directed between 1931 and 1936. It features a largely forgotten cast – only Felix Aylmer, here in a minor role, would go on to a significant film career.

Plot
Impecunious bookmaker's clerk Arnold Grierson, seeing a way to easy money, forces his daughter Margaret to marry wealthy but obnoxious songwriter Nevern, ignoring her romance with local newspaper editor Michael Hardwick.  Soon after the wedding, Grierson requests the loan of a significant sum of money from Nevern and is furious and humiliated to be flatly turned down.  He begins to make elaborate plans to murder Nevern on the assumption that Margaret will then inherit her husband's estate.  Meanwhile, the desperately unhappy Margaret has rekindled her relationship with Hardwick.  Nevern finds them in a café together and causes a public scene.  Margaret determines that her only course of action is to divorce Nevern, a prospect which horrifies her father.

Nevern is in the process of composing a new song, and lodges a draft manuscript with his publisher.  Making sure he has set up a foolproof alibi, Grierson goes to Nevern's house and kills him as he is finalising his new composition.  As he leaves through one door, Hardwick, intending to ask Nevern to divorce Margaret, arrives through another.  Hardwick finds the body and alerts the police, who in the circumstances do not believe his story and arrest him on suspicion of murder.

The interested parties later gather at Nevern's home to hear the reading of the will.  Margaret is declared the sole inheritor of all her husband's money and assets, to the delight of her father.  He is so happy that he begins to whistle, and gives himself away because it is Nevern's finished composition, which he could only have heard by being in the house on the night of the murder.

Cast
 Campbell Gullan as Arnold Grierson
 Marjorie Corbett as Margaret Nevern
 Gerald Fielding as Michael Hardwick
 Dora Barton as Letty Grierson
 Eric Maturin as Nevern
 Charles Mortimer as Oliver Bloom
 Oriel Ross as Elsie
 Henry Caine as Stringer
 Sybil Grove as Mrs. Bancroft
 Felix Aylmer as Graham

Preservation status
The Price of a Song is among eleven of these films of which no extant print has been located, and its current status is "missing, believed lost", with only a handful of production stills known to survive. Along with Powell's directorial debut Two Crowded Hours (1931) and his feature The Man Behind the Mask (1936), The Price of a Song is currently included on the British Film Institute's "75 Most Wanted" list of missing British films.

Critical reception
In a contemporary review, Picture Show wrote, "Campbell Gullan as the murderer is good. Gerald Fielding as the journalist plays the part with confidence, and Marjorie Corbett as the daughter of the murderer gives an attractive performance. Entertaining."

References

External links 
 BFI 75 Most Wanted entry, with extensive notes
 
 
 

1935 films
1935 crime films
British crime films
British black-and-white films
1930s English-language films
Films directed by Michael Powell
Lost British films
Quota quickies
1935 lost films
Lost crime films
1930s British films